Camillus Erie Canal Park is a town park in Camillus, New York that preserves a seven-mile (11 km) stretch of the Erie Canal.  It includes the Nine Mile Creek Aqueduct, which is listed on the National Register of Historic Places.  The aqueduct underwent a $2 million restoration, completed in August 2009, which brought it back to navigable condition.

The park consists of  along seven miles (11 km) of the old canal stretching from Warners Road to Newport Road. 
  The park contains a replica of Sims' Store, a mid-19th-century canal store originally located about two miles east.  The store is operated as a museum and gift shop.  Other historic features include a salvaged set of lock gates from Old Erie Canal Lock 50 (Gere's Lock), a waste weir, a feeder canal, and the remnants of an earlier lock and aqueduct that were in use from 1825 to the mid-1840s.  The remains of the original 1825 canal ("Clinton's Ditch") can also be viewed from a nature trail.  The exact midpoint of the original Albany-Buffalo canal route is located in the park and denoted with a sign.

A separate display at the park features a Corliss steam engine rescued from a downtown Syracuse factory.

In 2007, the existing towpath between the Camillus park and the village of Jordan was improved to a stone dust trail as part of the New York State Canalway Trail project.  There is much to be done in developing a continuous trail further.

See also
Jordan Canal Park
Old Erie Canal State Historic Park
Schoharie Crossing State Historic Site

References

External links
Camillus Erie Canal Park and The Nine Mile Creek Aqueduct (official site)

Erie Canal parks, trails, and historic sites
Parks in Onondaga County, New York